Joseph V. Perry (February 13, 1931 – February 23, 2000) was an American actor possibly best known for his role as Nemo in Everybody Loves Raymond.

Early years
Perry began acting in his youth, winning the Glenn Ford Award at Santa Monica High School in California in 1949. His successes continued in 1952 when he was presented the best actor award at UCLA by Marlon Brando.

Career 
Perry officially started his film career in 1955 at the age of 24 and spent the next 45 years appearing in hundreds of films and television shows, including dramatic anthologies, westerns, medical dramas, police dramas, and classic sitcoms. He appeared in The Twilight Zone, Night Gallery in the episode "Midnight Never Ends" and on other shows including Rawhide, Dr. Kildare, Gunsmoke, Official Detective, The Doris Day Show (in 3 episodes), Bewitched (in 4 episodes), M*A*S*H, I Dream of Jeannie, and The Partridge Family (in 4 episodes).  In the 1970s his visibility peaked with guest appearances on shows, including Mannix (in 5 episodes), The F.B.I. (in 8 episodes), Emergency! (in 3 episodes), The Streets of San Francisco (in 2 episodes), Sara, Barney Miller (in 4 episodes), The Rockford Files and Kojak (in 3 episodes).  However, he failed to land any mainstream acting roles until 1978, when he got several roles in shows such as The Incredible Hulk, MacGyver, Cheers, Murder, She Wrote (in 2 episodes) and Seinfeld. On the series Everybody Loves Raymond he got the biggest break of his later career when he portrayed Nemo, a pizza restaurant owner from 1996 to 1999, in a total of seven episodes, until his death in 2000.

Death
On February 23, 2000, Perry died in Burbank, California. His character's last appearance in Everybody Loves Raymond was shown posthumously when his restaurant got bought out.  Nemo's last two appearances were played by Robert Ruth.

Partial filmography

Selected Television

References

External links
 
 
 Variety, March 29, 2000

1931 births
2000 deaths
American male film actors
American male television actors
Male actors from Pittsburgh
Deaths from diabetes
20th-century American male actors